Joseph Andre Claude Cardin (born February 17, 1941 in Sorel-Tracy, Quebec) is a Canadian former ice hockey left winger.

Cardin was signed by the Montreal Canadiens but was traded to the St. Louis Blues and played just one game in the National Hockey League for the during their inaugural 1967–68 NHL season, having spent much of his tenure with the Kansas City Blues.  He split the 1970–71 season in the Eastern Hockey League for the Syracuse Blazers and in the International Hockey League for the Des Moines Oak Leafs before retiring.

See also
 List of players who played only one game in the NHL

External links
 

1941 births
Canadian ice hockey left wingers
Des Moines Oak Leafs players
French Quebecers
Sportspeople from Sorel-Tracy
Kansas City Blues players
Living people
Omaha Knights (CHL) players
Portland Buckaroos players
Quebec Aces (AHL) players
St. Louis Blues players
Syracuse Blazers players
Ice hockey people from Quebec